Inermocoelotes brevispinus is a spider species in the family Agelenidae, found in Bulgaria.

See also 
 List of Agelenidae species

References 

Inermocoelotes
Spiders of Europe
Spiders described in 1996